Mithila may refer to:

Places
 Mithilā, a synonym for the ancient Videha state
 Mithilā (ancient city), the ancient capital city of Videha
 Mithila (region), a cultural region (historical and contemporary), now divided between India and Nepal
 History of Mithila Region
 Mithila (proposed Indian state)

People
 Mithila Prasad Tripathi, Indian poet of Sanskrit language
 Mithila Sharma, Nepalese dancer and actor
 Rafiath Rashid Mithila, Bengali model, actress, and singer
 Mithila Palkar (born 1993), Indian actress

Other uses
 Mithila (moth), a genus of moths of the family Erebidae
 Mithila painting, an Indian painting style

See also